Nong Khaem can mean: 
 Nong Khaem District, a district of Bangkok, Thailand 
 Nong Khaem, Phrom Phiram, a subdistrict of the Phrom Phiram District of Phitsanulok Province, Thailand